The European Athletics U20 Championships (formerly named the European Athletics Junior Championships up to 2015) are the European championships for athletes who are under-20 athletes, which is the age range recognised by World Athletics as junior athletes. The event is currently organized by the European Athletic Association.

The history of the biennial athletics competition stems from the European Junior Games, which was first held in 1964. The event was first sanctioned by the continental governing body, the European Athletic Association at the following edition in 1966 and after a third edition under the games moniker it was renamed to its current title.

Editions

Championship records

Men

Women

All-time medal table

European Junior Championships
Medal table includes 1970–2021 Championships.

European Junior Games
Medal table includes 1964–1968 Championships.

See also
 IAAF World U20 Championships

References

External links
Home page

 
U20
Under-20 athletics competitions
Continental athletics championships
Biennial athletics competitions